Emma White (born ) is a British female artistic gymnast, representing her nation at international competitions.  She participated at world championships, including the 2006 World Artistic Gymnastics Championships in  Aarhus, Denmark. She also competed at the 2014 Commonwealth Games.

References

1990 births
Living people
British female artistic gymnasts
Place of birth missing (living people)
Gymnasts at the 2006 Commonwealth Games
Gymnasts at the 2010 Commonwealth Games
Gymnasts at the 2014 Commonwealth Games
Commonwealth Games competitors for Scotland